Susquehanna State Park can refer to:

 Susquehanna State Park (Maryland) near Havre de Grace, Maryland.
 Susquehanna State Park (Pennsylvania) in Williamsport, Pennsylvania.

or a related term, Susquehannock:

Susquehannock State Park in Lancaster County, Pennsylvania.
Susquehannock State Forest near Coudersport, Pennsylvania.

other possibilities:

Susquehanna State Forest in Otsego County, New York
Susquehanna Flight Park in Cooperstown, New York
Two Rivers State Park near Waverly, New York